The End of the Feud is a 1914 American silent drama film directed by Allan Dwan and featuring Murdock MacQuarrie, Pauline Bush, and Lon Chaney. The film is now considered lost.

Plot
The hillbilly families of Hen Dawson (Murdock Mac Quarrie) and Jed Putnam (William Lloyd) have been engaged in a deadly feud for fifty years. Dawson lives with a daughter named June (Pauline Bush), and a nephew named Wood Dawson (Lon Chaney) who is in love with his cousin June. Jed Putnam has only a son named Joel (William C. Dowlan), who has been secretly romancing June.

One day a new preacher moves into the territory and convinces the two patriarchs to stop their senseless feuding. They lay down their arms and declare a truce. Then Wood learns that Joel Putnam has been dating Wood's cousin June in secret. Wood starts spreading rumors that the two lovers have been engaged in immoral acts. The two rivals fight it out, and in the melee, Joel kills Wood Dawson.

Enraged over the death of his nephew, Hen Dawson forgets his oath and sets out to kill Joel Putnam. However, when he finds Joel, June is with him, getting ready to elope. Violence is averted at the last moment. The preacher once again gets the two warring clans to declare a truce by quickly marrying June and Joel, thus uniting the two families forever.

Cast
 Murdock MacQuarrie as Hen Dawson
 Pauline Bush as June Dawson
 Lon Chaney as Wood Dawson
 William Lloyd as Jed Putnam
 William C. Dowlan as Joel Putnam
 Jessalyn Van Trump

Reception
"Motion Picture News" stated "Drama of the South, beautiful scenery throughout....A good love story with unusual ending."

"Moving Picture World" said "A mountain feud story that works up into some gripping situations...Some excellent scenic effects heighten the interest of the film. The story is old in subject matter, but handled in a convincing manner."

References

External links

1914 films
1914 drama films
1914 short films
Silent American drama films
American silent short films
American black-and-white films
Lost American films
Films directed by Allan Dwan
Universal Pictures short films
1914 lost films
Lost drama films
1910s American films
1910s English-language films
Films about hillbillies
Films about feuds